Stefan Reimann-Andersen (born 13 July 1963) is an Austrian-German entrepreneur. Together with three of his siblings, they own 95% of Luxembourg-based investment firm JAB Holding Company.

A. Benckiser. However, none of eight siblings knew that their father was rich until his death in 1984. The JAB Holding Company produces such cleanings products as Sagrotan, Vanish or Calgonit, Jacobs coffee, Senseo pads, shoes from Bally or leather jackets from Belstaff. The family prefers to avoid publicity and live in anonymity. In 2006, they moved from Ludwigshafen to Vienna and then to Luxembourg.

Stefan Reimann-Andersen made the 2022 Forbes Billionaires List with an estimated wealth of $5.8 billion and occupied the 438th position.

References 

1963 births
Living people
German businesspeople
German billionaires
20th-century German businesspeople
21st-century German businesspeople